The Internazionali di Tennis Città di Forlì is a professional tennis tournament played on clay courts. It is currently part of the ATP Challenger Tour. It is held annually in Forlì, Italy since 2020.

Past finals

Singles

Doubles

References

ATP Challenger Tour
Clay court tennis tournaments
Tennis tournaments in Italy
Forlì
Recurring sporting events established in 2020